Craig Neil Evans (born 29 November 1969) is a Zimbabwean cricketer.

Cricket
Evans played in three Tests, against Sri Lanka, India and Australia, but was considered as a specialist at the one-day game. He appeared in the 1996 Cricket World Cup, with his highest international score 96 not out against Sri Lanka at SSC, Colombo in the Singer World Series in 1996.

In February 2020, he was named in Zimbabwe's squad for the Over-50s Cricket World Cup in South Africa. However, the tournament was cancelled during the third round of matches due to the coronavirus pandemic.

See also
 Rugby union in Zimbabwe

References

1969 births
Living people
Cricketers from Harare
White Zimbabwean sportspeople
Alumni of Falcon College
Mashonaland cricketers
Matabeleland cricketers
Zimbabwe One Day International cricketers
Zimbabwe Test cricketers
Zimbabwean cricketers
Commonwealth Games competitors for Zimbabwe
Cricketers at the 1998 Commonwealth Games
Cricketers at the 1996 Cricket World Cup
Zimbabwean rugby union players